Daniel Hans Sedin (born 26 September 1980) is a Swedish ice hockey executive and former professional ice hockey winger who played his entire 17-season National Hockey League (NHL) career with the Vancouver Canucks from 2000 to 2018. Born and raised in Örnsköldsvik, Sweden, Sedin and his identical twin brother Henrik played together throughout their careers; the pair were renowned for their effectiveness as a tandem. During his career, Daniel was known as a goal-scorer (150+ more career NHL goals than Henrik), while Henrik was known as a playmaker (150+ more career NHL assists than Daniel). Sedin tallied 393 goals and 648 assists in 1,306 games played in the NHL, ranking him as the Canucks' second-highest points scorer all time, behind only his brother Henrik.

Sedin began his professional career in the Swedish Hockey League with Modo Hockey in 1997 and was co-recipient, with Henrik, of the 1999 Golden Puck as Swedish player of the year. He played four seasons with Modo (including a return in 2004–05 due to the NHL lockout), helping the club to two consecutive appearances in the Le Mat Trophy Finals, in 1999 and 2000, where they lost both times. Selected second overall by the Canucks in the 1999 NHL Entry Draft, Sedin moved to the NHL in the 2000–01 season. He spent his entire NHL career in Vancouver, and in 2016 became the club's all-time top goal scorer. After emerging as a top player in the club during the 2005–06 season, Sedin since recorded six consecutive campaigns of at least 20 goals and 70 points. In 2011, he won the Art Ross Trophy as the League's leading point-scorer and the Ted Lindsay Award as the best player in the League, as voted by fellow players. Sedin was also nominated for the Hart Memorial Trophy as the League's most valuable player. In Sweden, he and Henrik were awarded the Victoria Scholarship as the country's athletes of the year. Alongside his brother, Daniel was inducted into the Hockey Hall of Fame in 2022.

Internationally, Sedin has competed on the Swedish national ice hockey team. In addition to being a three-time Winter Olympian, he has appeared in two European Junior Championships, two World Junior Championships and four World Championships. He won gold medals at the 2006 Winter Olympics in Turin and 2013 IIHF World Championship in Stockholm. Sedin earned a silver medal at the 2014 Olympics in Sochi and two World Championship bronze medals, at the 1999 and 2001 editions.

Early life 
Daniel Sedin was born on 26 September 1980, in Örnsköldsvik, Sweden, six minutes after his identical twin brother, Henrik. The pair have two older brothers, Stefan and Peter. Their father, Tommy, is a school vice-principal and also played for Modo Hockey in the 1960s, while his mother, Tora, is a nurse. Daniel began playing organized hockey with Henrik when they were eight. They did not regularly play on the same line until Daniel switched from centre to wing at 14. Daniel and Henrik both attended high school at the Nolaskolan Gymnasium in Sweden while playing professionally for Modo.

Playing career

Modo Hockey (1997–2000) 
Aged 16, Daniel and Henrik began their professional careers in 1997–98 with Modo Hockey of the Swedish Hockey League. Daniel recorded 12 points over 45 games during his rookie season. In his second professional year, he led Modo in scoring with 42 points in 50 games, helping the club to its second regular season title in team history. Daniel then added 12 points in 13 playoff games as Modo advanced to the Le Mat Trophy Finals, where they lost to Brynäs IF. At the end of the campaign, Daniel and Henrik were named co-recipients of the Golden Puck, the Swedish player of the year award.

The Sedins were considered top prospects for the 1999 NHL Entry Draft. Rated as the top draft-eligible players from Europe, they were expected to be top five selections and expressed a desire to play for the same team. As they were unlikely to be picked by the same team, their agent, Mike Barnett, president of international talent agency IMG, presented them with two options to circumvent the usual NHL draft process, allowing them to play together. The first option was for the pair to enter the 1999 Draft and not sign with their respective NHL clubs for two years, allowing them to become unrestricted free agents. This option required that they play junior hockey in North America, which was not their intention. Barnett also suggested either Henrik or Daniel opt out of the 1999 Draft, hoping that the team that selected the first twin would select the other the following year. On the possibility of the Sedins' playing for separate teams, Vancouver Canucks Scout Thomas Gradin commented, "They're good enough to play with anyone, but separately their capacity might decrease by 10 or 15 percent." Nevertheless, Henrik and Daniel both entered the 1999 Draft expecting to be selected by separate teams. However, then-Canucks general manager Brian Burke already possessed the third overall pick and through a series of transactions he obtained the second overall pick. He used these second and third overall picks to select Daniel and Henrik, respectively. Gradin notified them of the Canucks' intentions five minutes before the Draft. Although Tampa Bay Lightning general manager Rick Dudley was ready to make Daniel his first overall choice before opening negotiations, he was convinced by Burke and Barnett that Daniel would not sign unless his brother was on the same team.

On 27 July 1999, a month following the Draft, Daniel and Henrik signed identical three-year, US$1 million contracts with the Canucks. As the contract did not require them to begin playing in Vancouver immediately, they announced on 12 August they would return to Sweden to play one more season with Modo. During the 1999–2000 season, Daniel finished second in team scoring with 45 points in 50 games, two points behind Henrik. The two brothers played on a line during the season with New York Islanders prospect Mattias Weinhandl. In the 2000 playoffs, Daniel added a team-leading eight goals and 14 points. He recorded two goals and two assists in the deciding game of the semifinals against Brynäs IF, a 6–3 win for Modo. Modo made their second straight finals appearance, where they lost the playoff championship to Djurgårdens IF in three-straight games.

Vancouver Canucks (2000–2018)

2000–2006 
The 2000–01 NHL season was Daniel's first season with the Canucks. His debut was the team's first game of the campaign on 5 October 2000, a 6–3 loss to the Philadelphia Flyers. Daniel and Henrik became the fourth pair of twins to have played in the NHL. Three days later, Daniel scored his first career NHL goal against goaltender Dan Cloutier of the Tampa Bay Lightning. Assisted by Henrik, the goal tied the game at 4–4 with 1:13 minutes left to go in a 5–4 regulation win. On 30 November 2000, he suffered a shoulder injury, sidelining him for four games. During his recovery, he was reprimanded by Canucks head coach Marc Crawford, who told him that playing through pain is part of being in the NHL. Later in the season, he missed an additional three games due to a back injury, shortening his rookie season to 75 games. He became the first rookie in 2000–01 to reach 20 goals when he scored on 21 March 2001, in a 1–1 tie against the Columbus Blue Jackets. Finishing the campaign with that goal total, he tied for second among League rookies in scoring with Shane Willis, behind Brad Richards. He also had 14 assists for 34 points in total. Making his Stanley Cup playoff debut against the Colorado Avalanche, Daniel recorded an assist in the opening game of the first-round series, a 5–4 loss for the Canucks. He added his first NHL playoff goal later in the series as the Canucks were eliminated in four-straight games. He and Henrik played primarily on the Canucks' third line. Daniel received one third-place vote from the Professional Hockey Writers' Association for the Calder Memorial Trophy as NHL rookie of the year, finishing eighth in award balloting overall.

During the off-season in May 2001, Daniel underwent surgery for a herniated disc in his lower back, from which he suffered during the 2001 World Championships in Germany. In his second NHL season, Daniel struggled with the lowest goals total of his career, with nine. The campaign included a 25-game stretch without a goal between mid-October and the end of November 2001. With 23 assists, he had 32 points overall. Vancouver finished with the eighth seed in the Western Conference for the second consecutive year. Facing the Detroit Red Wings in the first round, they were eliminated in six games. The following season, in 2002–03, Daniel continued his point-scoring pace of the previous two campaigns with 14 goals and 17 assists. Vancouver finished the regular season fourth overall in the West and advanced to the second round for the first time in Daniel's career. He appeared in a career-high 14 playoff games and recorded six points, as the Canucks were defeated in seven games by the Minnesota Wild. Daniel and Henrik were re-signed in the off-season to one-year, US$1.125 million contracts on 29 July 2003.

The Sedins began the 2003–04 season on a line with first-year player Jason King. The trio were dubbed the "Mattress Line" (two twins and a King) and formed the Canucks' second scoring line until King was reassigned to the team's minor league affiliate midway through the season. Daniel was awarded his first penalty shot on 17 January 2004, in a game against the Mighty Ducks of Anaheim. He was stopped by goaltender Jean-Sébastien Giguère as Anaheim went on to win the game 2–1. On 24 February 2004, Daniel recorded his first NHL career hat-trick with a four-goal effort in a 4–2 win over the Detroit Red Wings. Over 82 games, Daniel increased his production to 18 goals and 54 points. The Canucks won the Northwest Division title in the regular season, before losing to the Calgary Flames in the first round of the playoffs. Daniel recorded a goal and two assists in the seven-game series.

During the off-season, Daniel and Henrik were re-signed to one-year, US$1.25 million contracts on 10 September 2004. However, due to the 2004–05 lockout, Daniel returned to Sweden to play for Modo, along with Henrik and their Canucks teammate Markus Näslund. He finished the season with 33 points in 49 games, fourth in team scoring behind Peter Forsberg, Mattias Weinhandl and Henrik.

When NHL play resumed in 2005–06, Daniel returned to the Canucks and scored 71 points. He tied for third in team point-scoring with Todd Bertuzzi, behind Henrik and Näslund. His scoring success that season was influenced, in part, by the signing of winger Anson Carter, who played on the Sedins' line and led the team in goal-scoring. The trio matched the scoring pace of the Canucks' top line of Näslund, Bertuzzi and Brendan Morrison. Vancouver's head coach at the time, Marc Crawford, recalled that season as marking the Sedins' ascent to leaders on the team, stating that "by the end of that year, they definitely were our top guys. They had surpassed Näslund and Bertuzzi." Despite the brothers' individual achievements, the Canucks missed the playoffs for the first time in their careers. During the off-season, Daniel and Henrik re-signed with the Canucks to identical three-year, $10.75 million contracts on 30 June 2006. Despite the Sedins' success with Carter, the Canucks did not re-sign him; he joined the Columbus Blue Jackets the following season.

2006–2010 
In the 2006–07 season, Daniel established himself as the Canucks' top scorer. He led the team with 36 goals and 84 points to lead the Canucks in scoring. He also tied a League record with four goals in overtime over the course of the season. Daniel notched his second career NHL hat-trick on 6 February 2007, scoring two goals against goaltender Dwayne Roloson and one into an empty net. He later took the second penalty shot of his career on 8 March 2007, against the Phoenix Coyotes. However, he was stopped once again by Curtis Joseph; Vancouver went on to win the game 4–2. Winger Taylor Pyatt, acquired in a trade from the Buffalo Sabres during the off-season, replaced Carter as the Sedins' linemate and went on to score a career-high 23 goals. In the opening game of the 2007 playoffs against the Dallas Stars, Daniel assisted on Henrik's quadruple-overtime goal to end the longest-ever Canucks playoff game and the sixth longest in NHL history at 138 minutes and six seconds of play. Daniel struggled to produce offensively in the playoffs, however, managing five points over 12 games as the Canucks were eliminated by the Anaheim Ducks in the second round.

Daniel recorded 74 points in 2007–08, as the Canucks missed the playoffs for the second time in three years. He finished second in team point-scoring to Henrik and first in goals with 29. The Sedins saw some time with Näslund on their top line during the season to form an all-Swedish forward unit. The following season, Daniel recorded 31 goals and 82 points, tying Henrik for the team lead in points. He opened the campaign being named the NHL's First Star of the Week on 13 October 2008, with a five-point effort over two games. Steve Bernier had been acquired in the 2008 off-season in another trade with the Sabres, and began the season on the top line with the Sedins. Bernier was later removed; on 12 February 2009, head coach Alain Vigneault moved Alexandre Burrows up from the third line during a game against the Phoenix Coyotes. Late in the campaign, Daniel was named the NHL's Second Star of the Week on 30 March 2009, after recording four goals and four assists in four games, including a game-winning goal. He added ten points over ten games in the 2009 playoffs, helping the Canucks advance to the second round, where they were defeated in six games by the Chicago Blackhawks.

Set to become unrestricted free agents on 1 July 2009, Daniel and Henrik began negotiating with the Canucks in the off-season and were reported to have asked for 12-year, $63 million contracts in mid-June. With free agency looming, Canucks general manager Mike Gillis visited the Sedins in Sweden, where they agreed on identical five-year, $30.5 million contracts on 1 July.

Four games into the 2009–10 season, Daniel suffered the first major injury of his career, breaking his foot in a game against the Montreal Canadiens. He suffered the injury after being hit by a slapshot from teammate Alexander Edler. Although Daniel finished the game and recorded three assists, x-rays several days later revealed a fracture. He was sidelined for 18 games, returning to the ice on 22 November against the Chicago Blackhawks. Soon after his return, he notched his third career NHL hat-trick in a 4–2 win against the Atlanta Thrashers on 10 December. Four days later, he was named the NHL's Second Star of the Week with seven points over the course of the week. In the final game of the regular season, on 10 April 2010, against the Calgary Flames, Daniel scored his fourth career NHL hat-trick in a 7–3 win. All three goals were assisted by his brother, helping Henrik pass Alexander Ovechkin for the Art Ross Trophy as the NHL's leading point-scorer. The last goal was chosen by TSN in a fan-voted poll as the NHL's play of the year; Daniel received a between-the-legs tip pass from Henrik near the corner boards before beating goaltender Miikka Kiprusoff with a between-the-legs deke. Daniel finished the season with a career-high 56 assists and 85 points despite playing an injury-shortened 63-game campaign. His 1.35 points per game rate was third in the League behind Henrik and Ovechkin. In the subsequent 2010 playoffs, Daniel recorded ten points in the opening round against the Los Angeles Kings, including the series-winning goal in the late stages of Game 6. Against Chicago the following round, his production decreased to four points as the Canucks were eliminated in six games. In the off-season, Daniel was named to the NHL second All-Star team. It marked the first time since 1973–74 that two brothers were named post-season NHL All-Stars, as Henrik had been named to the First Team. They were also chosen to appear together on the cover of EA Sports' European version of the NHL 11 video game.

2010–2013 
On 9 October 2010, Daniel was named an alternate captain for the Canucks, who named Henrik captain during a pre-game ceremony to celebrate the team's 40th anniversary. He was joined by Ryan Kesler, Kevin Bieksa and Manny Malhotra as alternates. Daniel wore the "A" during Canucks home games, along with Kesler. On 10 January 2011, Daniel was named the NHL's First Star of the Week after scoring five goals and seven points in four games. During that span, he scored the 10,000th goal in Canucks franchise history in a 3–1 win against the Calgary Flames on 5 January. Later in the month, Daniel competed in his first career NHL All-Star Game. Drafted onto Team Staal, he played with Canucks teammate Ryan Kesler opposite Henrik on Team Lidstrom. In the Skills Competition, Daniel won the shooting accuracy segment by first beating Martin Havlát to all four targets in 7.3 seconds, then defeating Patrick Kane in the final in 8.9 seconds. The following day, Daniel recorded one assist as Team Staal lost the game 11–10. Towards the end of the 2010–11 season, Daniel compiled three goals and five assists in three games to be named the NHL's Second Star of the Week on 14 March 2011. During that month, he totalled nine goals and 12 assists in 15 games, earning him NHL Second Star of the Month honours. With a goal and an assist against the Los Angeles Kings on 31 March, Daniel became the fifth player in team history to reach the 100-point mark in one season (after Pavel Bure, Alexander Mogilny, Markus Näslund and Henrik Sedin).

Prior to the Canucks' final home game of the season a week later, Sedin was awarded the Cyclone Taylor Award as the team's most valuable player (MVP) and his third Cyrus H. McLean Award as the team's leading point-scorer. Finishing the campaign with a career-high 41 goals, 63 assists and 104 points, he won the Art Ross Trophy as the NHL's leading point-scorer. It marked the first time in NHL history that brothers led the League in scoring in back-to-back seasons, as Henrik had won the previous year. Chicago Blackhawks forwards Doug and Max Bentley also won separate scoring titles, but had achieved the feat three years apart in 1943 and 1946, respectively. He also received the Viking Award as the NHL's best Swedish player, following after Henrik who received it the year before.

Daniel's efforts helped the Canucks win the Presidents' Trophy as the team with the NHL's best regular season record for the first in franchise history. Entering the 2011 playoffs with the top seed in the West, the Canucks beat the Chicago Blackhawks, Nashville Predators and San Jose Sharks in the first three rounds to advance to the Stanley Cup Finals for the first time in 17 years. Playing against the Boston Bruins, the Sedins struggled to score in the Finals; through the series' seven games, Daniel recorded a goal and three assists. Consequently, the Canucks managed just eight goals in that same span. After losing Game 6 by a 5–2 score in Boston, Daniel told Vancouver Sun reporters, "We're going to win Game 7." They went on to lose the deciding contest 4–0. With nine goals and 20 points over 25 games, Daniel ranked fourth in playoff scoring behind Boston's David Krejčí, Henrik Sedin and Tampa Bay's Martin St. Louis. His 99 shots on goal marked the fifth-highest single playoffs total in NHL history.

A week after the Canucks' loss, Daniel was in attendance for the NHL Awards show in Las Vegas, having been nominated for the Hart Memorial Trophy as the NHL's most valuable player, the Ted Lindsay Award as the NHL's most outstanding player and the NHL Foundation Player Award for his and Henrik's work in the Vancouver community. Daniel won the Lindsay Award over forwards Martin St. Louis of the Tampa Bay Lightning and Corey Perry of the Anaheim Ducks. In Hart Trophy voting, he finished as the first runner-up to Perry with 51 first-place ballots and 960 voting points total (16 and 83 fewer than Perry, respectively). Daniel and Henrik also lost the NHL Foundation Award to Los Angeles Kings captain Dustin Brown. After being named to the NHL's second All-Star team the previous year, Daniel received First Team honours with Henrik for the 2010–11 season. Returning to Sweden in the off-season, Daniel and Henrik were co-recipients of the Victoria Scholarship, as the country's athletes of the year. They became the third and fourth ice hockey players to receive the award, after Stefan Persson in 1980 and Peter Forsberg in 1994. Henrik and Daniel were presented the award, commemorated with glass plates, on 14 July 2011, in the city of Borgholm.

At the midway point the following season, Daniel was named to his second consecutive NHL All-Star Game in January 2012. He was one of four players representing the Canucks, including Henrik, Alexander Edler and Cody Hodgson. Chosen to Team Alfredsson in the All-Star Fantasy Draft, he recorded a goal and an assist in a 12–9 loss to Team Chara. Later in the season, Daniel sustained a concussion after receiving a hit from Blackhawks defenceman Duncan Keith during a game on 21 March 2012. With Daniel in the neutral zone and without possession of the puck, Keith hit him in the head with his elbow. After being helped off the ice by a trainer, Daniel remained in the game for a shift before leaving the contest entirely. Two days later, Keith was suspended five games for his hit by the League. Sidelined for the remainder of the regular season, Daniel finished 2011–12 with 30 goals and 67 points over 72 games, a drop off from his League-leading total from the previous season.

Despite Daniel's injury late in the season, the Canucks won their second consecutive Presidents' Trophy. He remained out of the lineup for the first three games of the 2012 playoffs, all of which the Canucks lost against the eighth-seeded Los Angeles Kings. Returning for Game 4, Daniel helped the Canucks stave off elimination before they were defeated the following contest. In his two games played in the series, he recorded two assists.

Due to another lockout, the 2012–13 season was delayed until January 2013. The Sedins this time remained in Canada, as they decided that would return to Modo only if the entire season again wound up cancelled. In the second month of the season, Henrik recorded his 757th point, surpassing Markus Näslund as the Canucks' all-time leading scorer. Two months later, Daniel also passed Näslund, scoring a goal and an assist in a 3–1 win against the Chicago Blackhawks, ranking the Sedins first and second in team history. Playing in just 47 games due to the lockout-shortened season, Daniel recorded 12 goals and 40 points. He ranked second in team scoring behind Henrik's 45 points. In the playoffs, he added three assists in a four-game defeat to the San Jose Sharks. The series ended on a shorthanded goal due to a penalty assessed to Daniel in overtime. In pursuit of a loose puck in the defensive zone, Daniel bodychecked Sharks forward Tommy Wingels into the boards, resulting in a boarding penalty. The call would later be the subject of controversy as it was believed by many in the media, such as National Post journalist Cam Cole, as well as teammates, such as Henrik, that Daniel had made contact with Wingels shoulder-to-shoulder, which according to NHL rules, should not result in a boarding penalty.

2013–2018 
At the beginning of the 2013–14 season, the Sedins signed matching four-year, $28 million contract extensions with the Canucks. In 73 games, Daniel had 16 goals and 31 assists in 2013–14. The Canucks did not qualify for the playoffs, as Daniel had a 23-game goal-scoring drought and injured his hamstring during the Heritage Classic against the Ottawa Senators, which forced him to miss nine games. He scored multiple goals in only one game, the last of the season. During the second period of that game, a hit by the Flames' Paul Byron sent Daniel's head into the boards and ended his season. He was stretchered off the ice and briefly hospitalised.

On 23 November 2014, Daniel played his 1,000th game as a Canuck, joining Henrik and Trevor Linden as the only players in franchise history to reach that milestone. Daniel scored his 115th power play goal as a member of the Canucks in the third period of a 5–0 victory over the visiting Pittsburgh Penguins on 7 February 2015, giving him the franchise record for power play tallies, which had been held by Näslund. In April, Brother Henrik recorded his 700th career assist, setting up a goal by Daniel in a Canucks victory over the Kings. Daniel's overall statistical performance in 2014–15 was an improvement on the previous season. In 82 games, he had 20 goals and a team-high 76 points; the latter figure was good for eighth in the NHL, and earned Daniel the Cyrus H. McLean Award. The goal total exceeded his output in each of the previous two seasons, and he topped 70 points for the first time since 2010–11. The Canucks returned to the playoffs with a second-place finish in their division. In their first-round series with the Flames, Daniel scored two goals and had two assists. His goal in the fifth game gave Vancouver an eventual 2–1 win and extended the team's season. Despite his efforts, the Flames defeated the Canucks in six games. During the offseason, the Sedins expressed a desire to continue playing in Vancouver for the rest of their NHL careers.

Daniel reached 900 career points on 21 November 2015 with an assist on a goal by Henrik against the Blackhawks. He added a hat-trick in a 6–3 win. On 11 January 2016, Daniel scored in overtime to give the Canucks a 3–2 victory over the Florida Panthers. The goal was his second of the game and the 346th of his career, tying him with Näslund for the franchise record. Ten days later, Daniel beat Bruins goaltender Tuukka Rask for a third-period goal to become the highest-scoring Canucks player; it was his first of two goals in a 4–2 win. Midway through the 2015–16 season, Daniel was named to the NHL All-Star Game for the third time. He played on a team representing the Pacific Division in a three-on-three tournament. Daniel contributed two goals and an assist in their first game, a 9–6 win over Team Central. In the final against Team Atlantic, he assisted on the only goal of the game in a 1–0 Team Pacific victory. For 2015–16, Daniel had 28 goals, 33 assists and 61 points. The Canucks finished 28th in the NHL in points and failed to reach the postseason for the second time in three years.

By the 2016–17 season, their 16th with the Canucks, the Sedins were both 36 years old. They adopted a less aggressive playing style as they sought to reduce the number of risks they took on the ice. The Sedins remained among the top point-scorers on the Canucks; Daniel had 15 goals and 29 assists, and appeared in every game. His total of 44 points was the fewest Daniel had tallied since the 2002–03 season. The Canucks' 69 points left them 25 behind the final playoff qualifier in their conference. The Sedins remained with the Canucks in 2017–18, with their contracts set to expire at the end of the season. Daniel said that he and Henrik hoped to retire with the franchise.

On 30 November 2017, Daniel reached the 1,000-point milestone by scoring a power play goal in a 5–3 win against the Predators, joining Henrik as the only players to gain 1,000 points in the Canucks organization. A pregame ceremony in his honour was held on 2 December 2017.

Retirement 
On 2 April 2018, Daniel and Henrik announced that they would be retiring at the end of the season in a letter thanking the Canucks organization and their fans. On 5 April 2018, the Sedins played their final game in Rogers Arena against the Arizona Coyotes. In their last home game, Daniel recorded 2 goals including the game winner, both of which Henrik assisted on, to defeat the Coyotes 4–3 at 2:23 in overtime. Daniel played his final game on 7 April 2018, in a 3–2 shootout loss to the Edmonton Oilers; he retired alongside his brother Henrik at the end of the 2017–18 season after 17 seasons and 1,306 regular season games with the Vancouver Canucks. Despite their retirement, the Sedin brothers were named finalists for the King Clancy Trophy, awarded to the player who best exemplifies leadership qualities on and off the ice and gives back to his community, which they won on 20 June. The two brothers shared the award, becoming the first brothers in NHL history to share the King Clancy Trophy.

On 12 February 2020, Daniel's number 22 would be raised to the rafters alongside his brother Henrik's number 33 in an hour-long jersey retirement ceremony, the culmination of a week-long celebration of the twins' careers.

On 28 June 2022, it was announced that Daniel would join his brother Henrik in being inducted into the Hockey Hall of Fame later that year, together becoming the first career Canucks to make it to the hall.

Executive career 
On 22 June 2021, it was announced that Henrik and Daniel would join the Canucks Hockey Operations department and were named Special Advisors to the General Manager. 

On 30 May 2022, the Canucks announced that the Sedins had transitioned into new roles with player development, working daily on and off the ice with young players in Vancouver and Abbotsford.

International play 

Daniel made his North American debut competing for Sweden in the 1997 World U17 Hockey Challenge, held in Alberta. Leading the tournament in scoring with 26 points (nine goals and 17 assists) over six games, he helped Sweden to a silver medal. After going undefeated in five contests, they were defeated in the gold medal game by Team Ontario, 6–2.

Back in Europe, Daniel competed at the 1997 European Junior Championships, recording two goals and six points over six games. The following year, at the 1998 European Junior Championships, Sweden's final game required them to beat Russia by four goals to surpass Finland in goal differential and win the gold medal. Daniel recorded two assists as Sweden won 5–1.

In his NHL draft year, Daniel competed for Sweden at the 1999 World Junior Championships in Winnipeg, Manitoba. He recorded ten points in six games, and tied for second in tournament scoring with Daniel Tkaczuk of Canada and Scott Gomez of the United States, behind Brian Gionta of the United States. Sweden failed to medal, losing the bronze medal game against Slovakia by a score of 5–4. Later that year, Daniel made his debut for the Swedish men's team at the 1999 World Championships in Norway. He notched one assist over nine games as Sweden won the bronze medal.

In 2000, Daniel once again competed in both the World Junior and Men's Championships. At the junior tournament in Sweden, Daniel matched his previous year's output with 10 points. He was the third highest point-scorer in the tournament, behind Henrik and Milan Kraft of the Czech Republic. Again, Sweden failed to earn a medal, finishing in fifth place. At the Men's World Championships, Daniel and Henrik both recorded five points; they were the youngest players on the squad. Sweden did not achieve a medal, however, losing to Finland in the tournament quarterfinal.

Following his rookie season with the Canucks, Daniel made his third World Championships appearance, in 2001 in Germany. He was injured midway through the tournament and had to return to Vancouver for surgery on a herniated disc in his lower back. Sweden defeated the United States 3–2 to win its second bronze medal in three years. He made a fourth tournament appearance at the 2005 World Championships in Austria. Sweden missed out on the bronze medal, losing to Russia, 6–3. Daniel had an assist in a losing effort during the bronze medal game. He finished with nine points in nine games, which tied for fourth in tournament-scoring.

On 22 December 2005, Daniel was named to the Swedish Olympic team for the 2006 Winter Olympics in Turin. He joined Henrik, Markus Näslund and Mattias Öhlund as one of four Canucks on the squad. Competing in his first Olympics, he contributed four points as Sweden won a gold medal, defeating Finland 3–2 in the final. Four years later, he was once again named to the Swedish Olympic team for the 2010 Winter Games in Vancouver. Despite going into the tournament as one of Sweden's key players (in the corresponding NHL season, he was third among Swedish players in points despite missing 19 games), he ranked seventh among team forwards in total ice time. Sweden failed to defend their gold medal from Turin, losing to Slovakia in the quarterfinal. Daniel had a goal and two assists in four games.

After the Canucks were defeated in the 2013 Stanley Cup playoffs, Daniel joined his brother in appearing at the 2013 World Championships in their home country. The Sedins helped lead Sweden to the gold medal match, where they won 5–1 over Switzerland. In four games, Daniel had six points, including four assists on power play goals during the single-elimination rounds. Daniel represented Sweden at the 2014 Winter Olympics in Sochi, while his brother did not attend due to health concerns. He played in all six of Sweden's games, scoring a goal and four assists as the Swedes ultimately lost to Canada in the gold medal game. In 2016, the Sedins participated in the World Cup of Hockey, playing together on Sweden's first line. Team Europe eliminated Sweden in the semifinal round, 3–2 in overtime. Daniel contributed two assists in four games.

Playing style 

Throughout his career, Daniel has been known as a goal-scorer, usually finishing plays initiated by his brother, Henrik. However, Daniel is also a proficient playmaker and generates many sequences with Henrik off the cycle. Daniel's familiarity with Henrik's play enhances his effectiveness; the pair are known for their ability to find each other intuitively with passes, often without looking.

With offensive skill marking the prime component of his game, Daniel is known to avoid initiating contact with opposing players. Early in their careers, he and Henrik were knocked off the puck easily. As a result, players have often taken advantage of their lack of physicality by playing aggressively against them. This once led Canucks general manager Brian Burke to publicly complain, commenting during a 2002 playoff series against the Detroit Red Wings, "'Sedin' is not Swedish for 'punch me or headlock me in a scrum.'" As their careers progressed, the Sedins have worked on their strength, improving their puck possession, allowing them to play more effectively and with increased physicality.

Personal life 
Daniel met his wife Marinette in his hometown Örnsköldsvik around 1998. She came with him to Vancouver upon the start of Daniel's NHL career in 2000, and the two married in 2005. After earning a bachelor's degree in psychology at the University of British Columbia Marinette became involved with the Canucks Family Education Centre, helping female immigrants transition to the English language. Together, they have two daughters, Ronja (born in 2005) and Anna (born in March 2011), and a son, Erik (born in 2008). They live in the Vancouver neighbourhood of West Point Grey during the NHL season, returning to Sweden every summer.

In March 2010, Daniel and Marinette made a joint $1.5 million donation with Henrik and his wife Johanna to the BC Children's Hospital's $200 million project for a new building. The two families requested that it be put towards a pediatric intensive-care unit and a diagnostic imaging area.

Daniel and Henrik are devoted harness racing fans and race horse owners. Their most successful trotter so far is the 2013 Elitloppet winner Nahar.

Career statistics

Regular season and playoffs 
Bold indicates led league

International

*All statistics taken from NHL.com

NHL All-Star Games

Awards

Records 
 Vancouver Canucks' franchise record for all-time goals – 393 goals (surpassed Markus Naslund's 346 goals on 21 January 2016)
 Vancouver Canucks' franchise record for all-time power-play goals – 138 power-play goals (surpassed Markus Naslund's 114 power-play goals on 7 February 2015)

Transactions 
 26 June 1999 – Drafted by the Vancouver Canucks in the first round, second overall, in the 1999 NHL Entry Draft
 27 July 1999 – Signed with the Canucks to a three-year US$1 million contract
 29 July 2003 – Re-signed with the Canucks to a one-year, US$1.125 million contract
 10 September 2004 – Re-signed with the Canucks to a one-year, US$1.25 million contract
 30 June 2006 – Re-signed with the Canucks to a three-year, US$10.75 million contract
 1 July 2009 – Re-signed with the Canucks to a five-year, US$30.5 million contract
 1 November 2013 – Re-signed with the Canucks to a four-year, US$28 million contract

See also 
 List of family relations in the NHL

Notes

References

External links 

 
 
 

1980 births
Living people
Art Ross Trophy winners
Hockey Hall of Fame inductees
Ice hockey players at the 2006 Winter Olympics
Ice hockey players at the 2010 Winter Olympics
Ice hockey players at the 2014 Winter Olympics
Identical twins
King Clancy Memorial Trophy winners
Lester B. Pearson Award winners
Medalists at the 2006 Winter Olympics
Medalists at the 2014 Winter Olympics
Modo Hockey players
National Hockey League All-Stars
National Hockey League first-round draft picks
Olympic gold medalists for Sweden
Olympic ice hockey players of Sweden
Olympic medalists in ice hockey
Olympic silver medalists for Sweden
People from Örnsköldsvik Municipality
Ice hockey people from Vancouver
Swedish emigrants to Canada
Swedish expatriate ice hockey players in Canada
Swedish ice hockey left wingers
Swedish philanthropists
Swedish twins
Twin sportspeople
Vancouver Canucks draft picks
Vancouver Canucks players
Sportspeople from Västernorrland County